Kokalpur  is a village in Kapurthala district of Punjab State, India. The village is administrated by a Sarpanch Named Navdeep Singh, who is an elected representative.

Demography 
According to the report published by Census India in 2011, Kokalpur has total number of 258 houses and population of 1,377 of which include 722 males and 655 females. Literacy rate of Kokalpur is 70.44%, lower than state average of 75.84%.  The population of children under the age of 6 years is 115 which is  8.35% of total population of Kokalpur, and child sex ratio is approximately 797, lower than state average of 846.

Population data

Air travel connectivity 
The closest airport to the village is Sri Guru Ram Dass Jee International Airport.

Villages in Kapurthala

References

External links
  Villages in Kapurthala
 Kapurthala Villages List

Villages in Kapurthala district